Parimala Ranganathar Perumal Temples or Tiruindaloor is a Hindu temple dedicated to Vishnu, located in Thiruvilandur of Mayiladuthurai, a town in the South Indian state of Tamil Nadu. It is one of the Divya Desams, the 108 temples of Vishnu revered in Nalayira Divya Prabandham by the 12 poet saints, or the Alvars. This temple is along Kaveri and is one of the Pancharanga Kshetrams.

The temple is believed to be of significant antiquity with contributions at different times from Medieval Cholas, Vijayanagara Empire and Madurai Nayaks. The temple is enshrined within a granite wall and the complex contains all the shrines of the temple. The rajagopuram (the main gateway) has five tiers.

Parimala Ranganathar is believed to have appeared for Chandra, the moon god. The temple has six daily rituals at various times from 5:30 a.m. to 9 p.m., and twelve yearly festivals on its calendar. The temple is maintained and administered by the Hindu Religious and Chartibable Institutions Endowment Board of the Government of Tamil Nadu. The temple is one of the prominent tourist destinations in the district.

Legend

According to Hindu legend, the place is where moon god, Chandra is believed to have been relieved of his curse. Indu means moon and the place Tiruindaloor derives its name from the legend. Chandra worshiped Vishnu who appeared to please the devotee.

According to another legend, the Alvar saint Thirumangai Alvar visited the temple and the doors were locked at the time. He was singing praise of Parimala Ranganathar, but the door still was not open. After continuous singing, he became frustrated at one point and so asked Parimala Ranganathar to keep the temple for himself, when the doors were opened.

Architecture 

The central shrine, of the presiding deity Parimala Ranganathar, is made of  green stone.  The deity is seen in a reclining posture, facing east.  The consort of Parimala Ranganathar is Parimala Ranganayaki, who is also called Chandrasaapa Vimochanavalli and Pundareekavalli. The sanctum houses the images of river gods Cauvery and Ganga, as well as that of Santhanagopalakrishnan. The Hindu god of creation, Brahma, is sculpted on the wall. The temple has shrines of Yoga Narasimhar, Rama, Anjaneya, Suryam and Chandra. This temple has three prakarams (precincts) that house all the shrines and  has a five-tier, east-facing Rajagopuram. The Dvajasthamba Mandapam and Garuda Mandapam have sculpted pillars, with the latter having images of ten avatars of Vishnu.

Religious significance

The temple is revered in Nalayira Divya Prabandham, the 7th–9th century Vaishnava canon and classified as a Divya Desam, the 108 Vishnu temples that are revered in the Vaishnava canon. Pancharanga Kshetrams (also called Pancharangams, meaning the "five Rangams or Ranganathas") is a group of five sacred Hindu temples, dedicated to Ranganatha, a reclining form of the god Vishnu, on the banks of the Kaveri River. The five Pancharanga Kshetrams in the order of their successive locations, on the banks of the Kaveri River are: The Srirangapatnam called the Adi Ranga, the first temple on the banks of the Kaveri River from the upstream side; the Srirangam (island in Tiruchirappalli) in Tamil Nadu known as Adya Ranga (the last temple), Appalarangam or Koviladi at Tiurppernagar in Tamil Nadu, Parimala Ranganatha Perumal Temple, Mayiladuthurai and Vatarangam at Sirkazhi. The Sarangapani temple at Kumbakonam is mentioned in place of Vatarangam in some references.

Worship and festivals

The temple follows Pancharatra Agama and thenkalai tradition. The temple priests perform the pooja (rituals) during festivals and on a daily basis. Like other Vishnu temples of Tamil Nadu, the priests belong to the Vaishnava tradition, from the Brahmin community. The temple rituals are performed six times a day; Tiruvanandal at 8:00 a.m., Kala santhi at 9:00 a.m., Uchikalam at 12:30 p.m., Niyyanusandhanam at 6:00 p.m., Irandamkalam at 7:30 p.m. and Ardha Jamam at 9:00 p.m. Each ritual comprises three steps: alangaram (decoration), neivethanam (food offering) and deepa aradanai (waving of lamps) for both Parimala Ranganathar and Thayar. The food offerings during the six times are curd rice, Ven pongal, spiced rice, dosa, Ven pongal and sugar pongal respectively. The worship is held amidst music with nadasvaram (pipe instrument) and tavil (percussion instrument), religious instructions in the Vedas (sacred text) read by priests and prostration by worshippers in front of the temple mast. There are weekly, fortnightly and monthly rituals.

The major festival celebrated in the temple is the Chitrai festival, celebrated during the Tamil month of Chittirai. The other festivals in the temple include the 10-day Aaandal Aadi festival celebrated during July–August, Thayar Navaratri Utsavam during the Tamil month of Purattasi (September - October), 10-day Aipasi Thula Mahostavam during Aipasi (October - November), 10-day Vaikunta Ekadasi during Margali (December - January), Makara Sankranthi during January and Panguni Brahmotsavam during the month of Panguni (March - April).

See also
Divya Desams
Mangalasasanam by Divyadesam

References

External links

 

 
Vishnu temples in Mayiladuthurai district
Dravidian architecture